The 2002–03 Drexel Dragons men's basketball team represented Drexel University  during the 2002–03 NCAA Division I men's basketball season. The Dragons, led by 2nd year head coach Bruiser Flint, played their home games at the Daskalakis Athletic Center and were members of the Colonial Athletic Association (CAA).

The team finished the season 19–12, and finished in 3rd place in the CAA in the regular season.

Roster

Schedule

|-
!colspan=9 style="background:#F8B800; color:#002663;"| Regular season
|-

|-
!colspan=9 style="background:#F8B800; color:#002663;"| CAA Regular season
|-

|-
!colspan=9 style="background:#F5CF47; color:#002663;"| CAA tournament

|-
!colspan=9 style="background:#F5CF47; color:#002663;"| NIT

Awards
Robert Battle
CAA Defensive Player of the Year
CAA All-Conference First Team
CAA All-Defensive Team
CAA All-Tournament Team
CAA Player of the Week
CAA Dean Ehlers Leadership Award

Kenell Sanchez
CAA All-Tournament Team

Eric Schmieder
CAA All-Conference Second Team

References

Drexel Dragons men's basketball seasons
Drexel
Drexel
2002 in sports in Pennsylvania
2003 in sports in Pennsylvania